Cosmotettix is a genus of true bugs belonging to the family Cicadellidae.

The species of this genus are found in Europe and Northern America.

Species:
 Cosmotettix costalis
 Cosmotettix edwardsi

References

Cicadellidae
Hemiptera genera